Douglas Obelisk is an 8-metre (27 ft) marble obelisk, installed outside the British Columbia Parliament Buildings in Victoria, British Columbia. The sculpture was erected in 1881 to honour James Douglas, the first Governor of the Colony of British Columbia, and was made by Mortimer & Reid using marble from Beaver Cove, Vancouver Island.

References

External links
 

1881 establishments in Canada
1881 sculptures
Buildings and structures in Victoria, British Columbia
Marble sculptures in Canada
Monuments and memorials in British Columbia
Obelisks in Canada
Outdoor sculptures in Victoria, British Columbia